The 1993 Daytona 500, the 35th running of the event, was held February 14 at Daytona International Speedway in Daytona Beach, Florida as the first race of the 1993 NASCAR Winston Cup season. Dale Jarrett won the race.

Summary
Kyle Petty's No. 42 won the pole, putting a Petty on the Daytona 500 pole for the first time since 1966, and only the second time ever. Kyle was also the first North Carolina driver to win the 500 pole since Benny Parsons in 1982. His father Richard waved the green flag in the first Winston Cup race held since his retirement.

The start
The first lap was led by rookie Jeff Gordon, who was the youngest winner of a Gatorade 125-mile qualifier on Thursday. Shortly after this, CBS reporter Chris Economaki said that Rookie of the Year is an award he would be almost assured of. Engine failures for Dick Trickle and Jimmy Hensley (the latter would crash in Turn 1 in his substitution for the injured Jimmy Means) brought out the first two caution flags in the first 15 laps.

Mid-race summary
Over the next 110 laps, Dale Earnhardt, Ken Schrader, and Kyle Petty would lead the majority of the laps, with Jeff Gordon and Bobby Hillin Jr. leading a handful of laps as legitimate leaders. 1990 winner Derrike Cope and Harry Gant also led several of these laps, but they had pitted under the early yellows to stretch their fuel runs.

Meanwhile, two-time winner Bill Elliott dropped out of the race on lap 99, the victim of overheating in his #11 Ford Thunderbird.

Closing stages
Dale Earnhardt was the leader on Lap 130 when Wally Dallenbach Jr. brushed the Turn 4 wall. Sterling Marlin and Michael Waltrip were lined up behind him, and when Marlin backed off, Waltrip tagged him and sent him into a spin. Marlin caught air as he spun by Joe Ruttman, who was coming to pit road to retire with engine failure. 5 laps after the restart, Rick Wilson and Bobby Hamilton collided on the backstretch. Approaching 50 laps to go, 1991 Daytona 500 winner Ernie Irvan was turned into the wall exiting Turn 2, eliminating a possible winner. The first major wreck happened when Dale Earnhardt touched 1992 Indianapolis 500 winner Al Unser Jr. (competing in his only Winston Cup Series race).  His #46 Chevrolet crashed into the 90 of Bobby Hillin Jr., who spun into the path of polesitter Kyle Petty. Both had a heated verbal exchange, Hillin reportedly was telling Petty he had no brakes, but both were victims of circumstances. With 31 laps to go, Derrike Cope and Waltrip touched in Turn 2. Waltrip spun down into 1989 Winston Cup Champion Rusty Wallace and sent him into a horrific series of flips and rollovers in the grass. A little more than minute later, Ken Squier reported that Wallace came on the radio to crew chief Buddy Parrott and said, "I'm okay."

The finish
By this time, Hut Stricklin and Sterling Marlin presented themselves as contenders. Earnhardt led from the restart, only to be passed briefly by Dale Jarrett. The #3 was soon in the lead again, as he was pursued by the Chevrolets of Jarrett and Jeff Gordon, and the Fords of 1986 Daytona 500 winner Geoff Bodine, Hut Stricklin, Mark Martin, and Morgan Shepherd. The "Dale and Dale Show" commenced as Jarrett passed Earnhardt in the tri-oval as they took the white flag. As the leaders exited Turn 2, the CBS Sports producers told Ken Squier and Neil Bonnett through their headsets to let Ned Jarrett to "call his son Dale home". In response, Jarrett called the finish thus:

"Come on, Dale! Go, baby, go! All right, come on! I know he's got it to the floorboard; he can't do anymore! Come on! Take 'er to the inside! Don't let 'em get on the inside of you comin' around this turn! Here he comes, Earnhardt; it's the "Dale and Dale Show" as we come off Turn 4! You know who I'm pulling for, it's Dale Jarrett. Bring her to the inside, Dale! Don't let him get down there!  He's gonna make it! Dale Jarrett's gonna win the Daytona 500!!!"

The next weekend at Rockingham, Ned reportedly apologized to Earnhardt for his obvious show of bias, to which an understanding Earnhardt replied, "I'm a daddy too."

Results

References

Daytona 500
Daytona 500
NASCAR races at Daytona International Speedway